Piromania is a 1984 platform game published by Automata UK for the ZX Spectrum. Strange Loop previously published the game as Infernal Combustion.

Gameplay 
Piromania is a game in which the PiMan runs around setting fire to Walter's house, and the player is Walter trying to put the fires out.

Reception 
Daniel Canavan reviewed Piromania for Imagine magazine and stated that, "Arcade games generally don't hold my interest long. This one, however, is not bad, so if you are into arcade action and high score tables, I recommend it."

References

External links 
Review in Computer and Video Games
Review in Crash
Review in TV Gamer
Review in Personal Computer Games

1984 video games
Automata UK games
Platform games
ZX Spectrum-only games